Duke Jinhan or Marquess Jinhan (died 1099; born Wang Yu) was a Goryeo Royal Prince as the third and youngest son of King Munjong and Consort Ingyeong who would become the father of the future Queen Munjeong.

Biography

Early life and relative
Born as the youngest son of Munjong of Goryeo and Princess Suryeong, he was named Yu (유, 愉) and have 2 older brothers: Wang Do and Wang Su. Wang Yu was one of Yi Ja-yeon (이자연)'s grandson, paternal half brother or maternal first cousin to Sunjong, Seonjong, and Sukjong.

Life in the Royal court
In 1086, Wang Yu was appointed as Geomgyotaewi Susagong (검교태위 수사공, 檢校太尉 守司空) along with his other brothers and became Susado (수사도, 守司徒) in 1094 (ascension year of King Heonjong). Wang Yu was also promoted into Sangseoryeong (상서령, 尙書令) a year later alongside given "6,000 Sik-eup" (식읍 6,000호) and "400 Sik-sil" (식실 400호) while honoured as Duke Jinhan (진한공, 辰韓公).

According to the records left, Wang Yu once, along with Marquess Geumgwan, Marquess Byeonhan, and others were involved on Duke Buyeo's case that marry their own sister, Princess Jeokgyeong (적경궁주) by citing that it was an incestuous marriage and accused it of injustice, but their elder brother, King Seonjong rejected to hear it.

Death and Children
In 1099 (4th years reign of King Sukjong), Duke Jinhan died and was given the name Hwasin (화신, 和信) as his Posthumous name. His elder son would marry Princess Daeryeong (대령궁주)–King Sukjong's 1st daughter and became "Count Hoean" (회안백, 淮安伯), while his younger son would marry Daeryeong's youngest sister, Princess Boknyeong (복녕궁주) and became "Count Jingang" (진강백, 晉康伯) in 1120. Count Hoean was later died in 1126 and Count Jingang died in 1146. Meanwhile, their only sister would marry to King Yejong–Daeryeong and Boknyeong's older brother as his 3rd wife and then known as Queen Munjeong (문정왕후, 文貞王后).

Family 
Father: Munjong of Goryeo (고려문종, 29 December 1019 – 2 September 1083) 
Grandfather: Hyeonjong of Goryeo (고려현종, 1 August 992 – 17 June 1031)
Grandmother: Queen Wonhye of the Ansan Gim clan (원혜왕후김씨; d. 31 July 1022)
Mother: Worthy Consort Ingyeong of the Incheon Yi clan
Grandmother: Lady Gim, of the Gyeongju Gim (부인 김씨)
Grandfather: Yi Ja-yeon (이자연)
Consorts and their Respective issue(s):
Unknown Queen
Wang Gi (회안백 왕기, d. 1126), Count Hoean, first son
Wang Yeon (진강백 왕연, d. 1146), Count Jingang, second son
Queen Munjeong of the Gaeseong Wang clan (문정왕후 왕씨, d. 23 July 1138), first daughter

References

External links
Duke Jinhan on Encykorea .

Korean princes
Year of birth unknown
1099 deaths
10th-century Korean people
11th-century Korean people